Shekhupur  Assembly constituency is  one of the 403 constituencies of the Uttar Pradesh Legislative Assembly,  India. It is a part of the Badaun district and one  of the five assembly constituencies in the Aonla Lok Sabha constituency. First election in this assembly constituency was held in  2012 after the "Delimitation of Parliamentary and Assembly  Constituencies Order, 2008" was passed and the constituency was formed  in 2008. The constituency is assigned identification number 116.

Wards  / Areas
Extent  of Shekhupur Assembly constituency is KC Kakrala & Kakrala MB of Dataganj  Tehsil; KCs Jagat, Qadarchowk, Shekhupur, Sakhanoo NP & Gulariya NP of  Budaun Tehsil.

Members of the Legislative Assembly

Election results

2022

2012

See also
Aonla Lok Sabha constituency
Budaun district
Sixteenth Legislative Assembly of Uttar Pradesh
Uttar Pradesh Legislative Assembly
Vidhan Bhawan

References

External links
 

Assembly constituencies of Uttar Pradesh
Politics of Budaun district
Constituencies established in 2008